Soul Trader is the second studio album by English electronic music producer ils. It was originally released in the UK on 7 January 2002, followed by a US release on 5 August 2003. The album's release was succeeded with the release of three singles; "Next Level", "No Soul", and "Music" on Marine Parade Records in 2002. "Next Level" reached #75 in the UK Singles Chart and was included on the album as "6 Space (Next Level)".

Background
Following Walker's departure with Fuel Records following the release of Idiots Behind the Wheel, he signed with Marine Parade and released Soul Trader on 7 January 2002. Following this, three singles were released through Marine Parade, "Next Level", "No Soul", and "Music", to commercial success, with all three singles charting in the UK, at positions #75, #82, and #98 respectively.

On 5 August 2003, Myutopia Recordings released a US version of the album, featuring a different album cover and two exclusive bonus tracks. Myutiopa also released a DVD version of the album (featuring bonus music videos) on 14 August 2006.

Track listing

Release history

References

Ils (producer) albums
2002 albums